Jānis Sudrabkalns (May 17, 1894 – September 4, 1975), born Arvīds Peine, was a Latvian poet and writer.

1894 births
1975 deaths
People from Inčukalns Municipality
People from Kreis Riga
Members of the Central Committee of the Communist Party of Latvia
Communist Party of the Soviet Union members
Seventh convocation members of the Supreme Soviet of the Soviet Union
Eighth convocation members of the Supreme Soviet of the Soviet Union
Latvian poets
Latvian writers
20th-century poets
People's Poets of the Latvian SSR
Stalin Prize winners
Heroes of Socialist Labour
Recipients of the Order of Lenin
Recipients of the Order of the Red Banner of Labour
Soviet poets